A list of schools in St Albans, Hertfordshire, England:

Independent schools

State schools
Primary schools

Secondary schools

References 

Schools in St Albans